Faia Brava (Reserva da Faia Brava) is a natural reserve in northern Portugal. It is the first privately owned natural reserve in the country.

Bordered by the Côa River, it is part of the Archeological Park of the Côa Valley, a UNESCO world heritage site.

Given its strong biodiversity, Faia Brava reserve is identified as IBA (Birdlife’s International Important Bird Area), and is also one of the Natura 2000 areas (network of nature protection areas in the territory of the European Union).

Location 
Faia Brava is in northern Portugal. It is located in the municipalities of Figueira de Castelo Rodrigo and Pinhel, Guarda district.

It is 40 km north of Guarda and 17 km to the southeast of Vila Nova de Foz Côa.

History 
Before becoming a natural reserve, Faia Brava was farmland.

In 2000, the reserve was established by ATN Association  (Associação Transumância e Natureza ), and is, since then, owned and managed by this association.

Natural components 

Faia Brava reserve is characterized by strong biodiversity and picturesque landscapes, formed by steep canyons, forests and plains.

Flora 
Faia brava encompasses over 180 species of plants, including cork oak.

Fauna 
The reserve is home to 25 mammal species including wild horses (Garrano) and cattle (Maronesa, Sayaguesa),  it also hosts 100 birds species, including vultures (Gryphon, Egyptian), eagles (The Golden, Bonelli's), eagle owls and black storks.

Tourism 

Besides being an attractive natural spot, Faia Brava is surrounded by different touristic attractions:
 Medieval villages, such as Algodres and Figueira de Castelo Rodrigo
 Côa River
 Museu do Côa
 Prehistoric Rock Art Sites in the Côa Valley

Architecture 
Besides its natural potential, Faia Brava hosts many traditional constructions, reflecting the vernacular architecture of the region.

These constructions are mainly dovecotes (pombais in Portuguese) and traditional houses destined to touristic visits. They are made of stone and clay, with roofs of wood and tiles.

References

External links 
 Faia Brava ATN

Protected areas of Portugal
Biosphere reserves of Portugal
Figueira de Castelo Rodrigo